The Paishacha marriage is a non-righteous form of marriage described in Hindu literature. When a man stealthily rapes a woman who is asleep, intoxicated, or mentally challenged, it regarded to be a marriage, though only to preserve the honour of the woman. This is condemned in the Manusmriti as a sinful act. In modern times, this is classified as a form of date rape, and is a crime in most countries.

References

Marriage in Hinduism